The California Department of Social Services (CDSS) is a California state agency for many of the programs defined as part of the social safety net in the United States, and is within the auspices of the California Health and Human Services Agency. Federal and State funds for adoptions, the largest SNAP program in the country (known as CalFresh, formerly led by current Department of Aging Director Kim McCoy Wade), CalWORKs program, foster care, aid for people with disabilities, family crisis counseling, subsistence payments to poor families with children, child welfare services and many other efforts are distributed through this department.

On June 27, 2019, Governor Gavin Newsom appointed Kimberley Johnson as CDSS Director. Johnson previously served in other capacities at CDSS, including as deputy director of the Family Engagement and Empowerment Division, branch chief of CalWorks and Child Care, and branch chief of Child Care and Refugee Programs.

Its mission is "to serve, aid and protect the needy and vulnerable children and adults in ways that strengthen and preserve families, encourage personal responsibility, and foster independence."

Responsibilities 
CDSS has more than 4,000 employees in 54 offices throughout the state and is responsible for:

 CalWORKs, the Temporary Assistance for Needy Families (TANF) welfare-to-work program
 CalFresh is the California implementation of the federal Supplemental Nutrition Assistance Program (SNAP), formerly known as the Food Stamp program, which provides financial assistance for purchasing food for those in Poverty in California
 Ensuring efficient, accurate and equitable delivery of payments and benefits
 Providing services that foster self-sufficiency and dignity
 Providing social services to the elderly, blind, disabled and other children and adults
 Licensing and regulating foster homes, group homes, residential care facilities, day care facilities, child care facilities and preschools
 Evaluating eligibility of applicants for disability-related benefits for certain federal and state programs, including Supplemental Security Income, Social Security Disability and Medi-Cal

Organization

The Department of Social Services is divided into 10 divisions, with programs, branches, and agencies under those divisions:

 Administration
 Legal
 Children and Family Services
 Community Care Licensing
 Disability Determination Service
 Adult Programs
 Family Engagement and Empowerment
 State Hearings
 Information Systems

References

External links
Official website
 Licensing of Community Care Facilities in the California Code of Regulations
 Child Care Facility Licensing Regulations in the California Code of Regulations
 California Department of Social Services on USAspending.gov

Social Services
Department of Social Services